George "Yatz" Proeser (May 30, 1864 – October 13, 1941) was a starting pitcher and right fielder in Major League Baseball who played for the Cleveland Blues and Syracuse Stars teams of the American Association. He was born in Cincinnati.

In a two-season career, Proeser posted a 3–4 record with a 3.81 ERA in seven pitching appearances, all complete games including one shutout, giving up 25 earned runs on 53 hits and 30 walks while striking out 20 in 59.0 innings of work. As a hitter, he collected a .263 batting average (20-for-76) with one home run and seven RBI in 20 games, including 16 runs, three doubles, one triple, one stolen base, and a .356 on-base percentage.

Proeser died in New Burlington, Ohio, at the age of 77.

External links

Retrosheet

Cleveland Blues (1887–88) players
Syracuse Stars (AA) players
19th-century baseball players
Major League Baseball pitchers
Major League Baseball right fielders
Baseball players from Ohio
1864 births
1941 deaths
Leavenworth Soldiers players
Galveston Giants players
Austin Senators players
Omaha Omahogs players
Omaha Lambs players
Galveston Sand Crabs players
Grand Rapids (minor league baseball) players
Houston Mud Cats players
Dayton (minor league baseball) players
San Antonio (minor league baseball) players